Jean Franco Alexi Fuentes Velasco (born 7 February 1997) is a Venezuelan footballer who plays as a defender for Metropolitanos.

Career statistics

Club

Notes

References

1997 births
Living people
Venezuelan footballers
Venezuela youth international footballers
Association football defenders
Deportivo La Guaira players
Venezuelan Primera División players
21st-century Venezuelan people